William Morrow and Company is an American publishing company founded by William Morrow in 1926. The company was acquired by Scott Foresman in 1967, sold to Hearst Corporation in 1981, and sold to News Corporation (now News Corp) in 1999. The company is now an imprint of HarperCollins.

William Morrow has published many fiction and non-fiction authors, including Ray Bradbury, Michael Chabon, Beverly Cleary, Neil Gaiman, Erle Stanley Gardner, B. H. Liddell Hart, Elmore Leonard, Steven Levitt, Steven Pinker, Judith Rossner, and Neal Stephenson.

Francis Thayer Hobson was president and later chairman of the board of William Morrow and Company.

Morrow authors

 Christopher Andersen
 Harriet Brown
 Tabitha Brown
 Karin Slaughter
 Harry Browne
 Stephen Brusatte
 Meg Cabot
 Beverly Cleary
 Charles Dickinson
 Warren Ellis
 Bruce Feiler
 Neil Gaiman
 David J. Garrow
 Nikki Giovanni
 John Grogan
 Andrew Gross
 Jean Guerrero
 Joe Hill
 Ismail Kadare
 Steven Levitt
 Marjorie Herrera Lewis 
 Walter Lord
 Elizabeth Lowell
 Gregory Maguire
 Nicolai Malko
 Aubrey Mayhew
 Margaret Mead
 Christopher Moore
 Gerard K. O'Neill
 Wayne Pacelle
 Laurence J. Peter
 Robert Pirsig
 Nathan W. Pyle
 Cokie Roberts
 James Rollins
 Judith Rossner
 Thomas Savage
 Nick Schuyler
 Sidney Sheldon
 Margot Lee Shetterly
 Nevil Shute
 Dean Silvers
 Neal Stephenson
 Mary Stewart
 Jacqueline Susann
 Stephanie S. Tolan
 Paul G. Tremblay
 Irving Wallace
 David Wallechinsky
 Morris West
 Gary Zukav

References

External links
 Official website

1926 establishments in New York (state)
Book publishing companies based in New York (state)

News Corporation subsidiaries
Publishing companies based in New York City
Publishing companies established in 1926